Wrecked is an American sitcom that was created by Jordan Shipley and Justin Shipley for TBS. The series is about a group of people stranded on an island, after their airplane crashed in the ocean and is a parody of Lost. The 10-episode first season premiered on June 14, 2016.

On July 6, 2016, TBS renewed the show for a second season which was shot in Fiji. The second season premiered on June 20, 2017. On September 13, 2017, TBS renewed the series for a third season, which premiered on August 7, 2018. On April 26, 2019, it was reported that the series had been canceled by TBS after three seasons.

Cast 

 Zach Cregger as Owen O'Connor, a flight attendant
 Asif Ali as Pack Hara, a sports agent
 Brian Sacca as Daniel "Danny" Wallace, the son of a rich businessman
 Rhys Darby as Steve Rutherford, a New Zealander from Papakura
 Brooke Dillman as Karen Cushman/Sister Mercy, a statistical analysis executive for Bing
 Ginger Gonzaga as Emma Cook, a podiatrist (season 1, guest Season 2-3)
 Jessica Lowe as Florence Bitterman, Emma's best friend, a pretentious feminist
 Will Greenberg as Todd Hinkle, an obnoxious guy who cares more about his finding the meaning to life than his girlfriend
 Ally Maki as Jess Kato, Todd's girlfriend, then fiancée and later, wife
 James Scott as Liam, a British soldier (pilot only)

Recurring
 Pablo Azar as Pablo (season 1)
 George Basil as Chet Smart 
 Lela Elam as Diane from Toledo (season 1-2)
 Todd Allen Durkin as Kurt Turdhole (season 1, guest Season 2)
 Brendan Jennings as Jerry, a deceased castaway with whom Pack has conversations during his hallucinations (season 1)
 Mike Benitez as Roger (season 1)
 Will McLaughlin as Bruce Island
 Ruben Rabasa as Yolonzo (season 1)
 Rory Scovel as Corey (season 2, guest Season 1)
 Eliza Coupe as Rosa, Owen's co-worker (season 1)
 Erinn Hayes as Rosa, Owen's co-worker (season 2)
 Ebonée Noel as The Barracuda (season 2)
 Ravi Patel as Tank Top (season 2, guest 1)
 Lucas Hazlett as Bandana (season 2, guest 1)
 Shaun Diston as V-Neck (season 2)
 Patrick Cox as Flannel (season 2)
 Jemaine Clement as Luther (season 2)
 Dink O'Neal as Richard "Dick" Wallace, Danny's father (season 1, guest Season 2)
 Jonno Roberts as Declan Stanwick (season 3)
 Rachel House as Martha Stanwick (season 3)
 Robert Baker as Brewster (season 3)
 Will Hines as Greg Peabody (season 3)
 Eugene Cordero as Errol (season 3)
 Karan Soni as Keith (season 3)

Guest starring
 Darin Toonder as Owen's father
 Luke Nappe as Young Owen
 Gary Anthony Williams as Gary, Jerry's deceased friend
 Josh Lawson as Eric, Steve's boss
 Elke Berry as Carol, Steve's ex-wife
 Jamie Denbo as Greta Liebowitz, Pack's boss
 Chris Bosh as himself
 Marc Evan Jackson as Father Daddy
 Sara Paxton as Sister Grace
 Britt Lower as Margot Wallace, Danny's sister
 Rob Corddry as himself

Development 
TBS ordered the production of the pilot episode written by Jordan Shipley and Justin Shipley in October 2014. The show follows a group of people after they survived a plane crash on a deserted island. The pilot was filmed in Puerto Rico and was picked up to series with a 10-episode order in May 2015.

Episodes

Season 1 (2016)

Season 2 (2017)

Season 3 (2018)

Reception
Wrecked has received mixed reviews. On Metacritic, the show holds a score of 56%, indicating "mixed or average reviews".

References

External links
 

2017 in Fiji
Television shows set in Fiji
Television shows filmed in Puerto Rico
Television shows filmed in Fiji
Television series by Studio T
TBS (American TV channel) original programming
2010s American parody television series
2010s American single-camera sitcoms
2016 American television series debuts
2018 American television series endings
English-language television shows
Television shows set on islands
Television shows about aviation accidents or incidents